Molas may refer to:
 Molas, France, a commune in the Haute-Garonne department
 Molas Pass, a high mountain pass in the San Juan Mountains of western Colorado in the United States
 Isidre Molas (born 1940), a Catalan politician
 Felipe Molas López (1901–1954), a President of Paraguay in 1949
 Molas, plural of mola (fish)

MOLAS may refer to :
 Museum of London Archaeology Service (MoLAS), a self-financing part of the Museum of London Group, providing a wide range of professional archaeological services to clients in London, SE England, the UK and internationally

See also
 Mola (disambiguation)
 Moles (disambiguation)
 Molass (disambiguation)
 Molasse
 Mollas (disambiguation)